Rear Admiral Michael George Temple Harris  (born 5 July 1941) is a former Royal Navy officer who was the captain of  during the Falklands War. He was promoted lieutenant on 1 May 1963, and lieutenant commander on 1 May 1971, and retired on 3 April 1992.

He has lived with his wife, Katrina, in a Grade-II-listed house in Whitchurch, Hampshire, since 1992.

Harris is heir presumptive to the Harris barony currently held by his fourth cousin Anthony Harris, 8th Baron Harris.

References

1941 births
HMS Cardiff (D108)
Living people
Royal Navy rear admirals
Royal Navy personnel of the Falklands War